The 2003 Big Ten softball tournament was held at the Bob Pearl Softball Field on the campus of the University of Iowa in Iowa City, Iowa.  As the tournament winner, Iowa earned the Big Ten Conference's automatic bid to the 2003 NCAA Division I softball tournament.

Format and seeding
The 2003 tournament was a six team double-elimination tournament. The top six teams based on conference regular season winning percentage earned invites to the tournament.

Tournament

References

Big Ten softball tournament
Tournament
Big Ten softball tournament